Kilimanoor Raja Raja Varma Koithampuran alias Kareendran or Cherunni (1812–1845) was an accomplished Sanskrit poet, composer in the Court of Swathi Thirunal Rama varma, King of Travancore. He was born in the Kilimanoor palace. He was an expert in Drutha Kavitha and hence was known as Drutha Kavimani. He is known as Kareendran since he was tall and well built. His ability in writing and presenting poems within seconds earned for him the title Vidwan from His Highness Swathi Thirunal.

Compositions
Kathakali plays or attakatha
Raavana Vijayam
Seethankan thullal
Santhana Gopalam

References
Website on Swathi Thirunal accessed on
Kerala Govt Website

Notes

Sanskrit poets
1845 deaths
Year of birth unknown